Nicholas Starkel (born February 24, 1998) is an American football quarterback who is currently a free agent. He played college football at Texas A&M University, the University of Arkansas, and San Jose State University.

Early life and high school career 
Starkel was born in Pittsburgh to Wendy and Murray Starkel. Starkel lived in eight different cities prior to graduating from high school, as his father Murray was a longtime United States Army officer who worked with the Army's Corps of Engineers.

Starkel attended Liberty Christian School in Argyle, Texas, where he threw for 4,745 yards and 48 touchdowns in three seasons, 3,091 of which came from his senior season. A three-star recruit, Starkel initially committed to Oklahoma State, but after talking with former USC quarterback Cody Kessler, he de-committed from Oklahoma State and narrowed it to UCLA and Texas A&M, committing to play college football at Texas A&M.

College career

Texas A&M 
Starkel entered Texas A&M redshirting his true freshman season. As a redshirt freshman, he won the starting quarterback job, although he suffered a broken leg in the season-opener against UCLA. Starkel returned to play six more games in 2017, including a 499-yard, four touchdown performance against Wake Forest in the Belk Bowl that was a Belk Bowl record.

Under new head coach Jimbo Fisher, Starkel lost the starting job to Mond, the latter thriving under Fisher's system, leading to Starkel announcing he would transfer as a graduate student, with immediate eligibility.

Arkansas 
Starkel transferred to Arkansas before the 2019 season. He competed with Ben Hicks for the starting quarterback job, and split time with Hicks in the season opener against Portland State. After replacing Hicks in a 31–17 loss to Ole Miss, Starkel was named the Razorbacks starter for their game against Colorado State, throwing for 305 yards and three touchdowns in a 55–34 win. The following week, he threw five interceptions in a loss to San Jose State. Starkel announced he would transfer from Arkansas after one season, later citing conflict with head coach Chad Morris and offensive coordinator Joe Craddock.

San Jose State 
After Starkel put his name in the transfer portal, former San Jose State football player Josh Love reached out to Starkel and informed him the San Jose State coaches were interested in a transfer quarterback and put the two sides in touch. Starkel later announced that he would transfer to San Jose State in 2020.

At San Jose State, Starkel had a stellar 2020 season, posting career-highs in passing yards, touchdowns, and passer rating, as San Jose State went 7–0 in conference play and won the 2020 Mountain West Conference Championship. Starkel was named the game's most valuable player after throwing for 453 yards and three touchdowns in the game. Starkel was also named to the Mountain West's All-Conference second team.

With the NCAA approving a waiver that allowed college football players to retain their 2020 standing for the 2021 season due to the COVID-19 pandemic, Starkel announced on Twitter that he would return for a sixth season of eligibility.

Statistics

References

External links
 
 San Jose State profile
 Arkansas profile
 Texas A&M profile

1998 births
Living people
American football quarterbacks
Arkansas Razorbacks football players
San Jose State Spartans football players
Texas A&M Aggies football players
People from Denton County, Texas
Players of American football from Pittsburgh
Players of American football from Texas